Danito Nhampossa (born 20 March 1970) is a Mozambican footballer. He played in 18 matches for the Mozambique national football team from 1995 to 2008. He was also named in Mozambique's squad for the 1996 African Cup of Nations tournament.

References

1970 births
Living people
Mozambican footballers
Mozambique international footballers
1996 African Cup of Nations players
Place of birth missing (living people)
Association footballers not categorized by position